Miroslav Čermelj (Serbian Cyrillic: Мирослав Чермељ; born 27 December 1972) is a Serbian former professional footballer who played as a defender.

Career
Čermelj came through the youth system of Red Star Belgrade, before making his senior debut at Obilić. He later switched to Partizan, becoming a member of the team that won the double in the 1993–94 season. Prior to moving abroad, Čermelj also spent two seasons with OFK Beograd.

In the summer of 1997, Čermelj moved to Mexico and signed with UNAM. He returned to Europe and joined La Liga club Extremadura in 1998. After failing to make an impact in Spain, Čermelj went to Asia and played for Beijing Guoan in the Chinese Jia-A League.

Honours
Partizan
 First League of FR Yugoslavia: 1993–94
 FR Yugoslavia Cup: 1993–94

References

External links
 
 
 

Association football defenders
Beijing Guoan F.C. players
CF Extremadura footballers
Chinese Super League players
Club Universidad Nacional footballers
Expatriate footballers in China
Expatriate footballers in Mexico
Expatriate footballers in Spain
First League of Serbia and Montenegro players
FK Čukarički players
FK Obilić players
FK Partizan players
FK Rudar Pljevlja players
Liga MX players
OFK Beograd players
Serbia and Montenegro expatriate footballers
Serbia and Montenegro footballers
Serbia and Montenegro expatriate sportspeople in China
Serbia and Montenegro expatriate sportspeople in Mexico
Serbia and Montenegro expatriate sportspeople in Spain
Serbian footballers
Footballers from Belgrade
1972 births
Living people